Coligny may refer to:

People
Coligny Brainerd Metheny (1889-1960), played football and basketball for Carnegie Tech
House of Coligny, a French noble family, and its most famous members:
Gaspard I de Coligny (1465/1470–1522), known as the Marshal of Châtillon, a French soldier
Odet de Coligny (1517–1571), French cardinal of Châtillon, bishop of Beauvais
Gaspard II de Coligny (1519–1572), Seigneur (Lord) de Châtillon, admiral of France and Protestant leader
François de Coligny d'Andelot (1521–1569), one of the leaders of French Protestantism during the French Wars of Religion
Louise de Coligny (1555-1620), daughter of Gaspard II de Coligny
François de Coligny (1557–1591), Protestant general during the Wars of Religion
Gaspard III de Coligny (1584–1646), Protestant general
Jean de Coligny-Saligny (1617–1686), French nobleman and army commander
Henriette de Coligny de La Suze (1618-1673), French writer

Places
 Coligny, Ain, a commune in France
 Canton of Coligny, an administrative division in the Ain department, France, disbanded in 2015
 Colligny, formerly spelled Coligny, a municipality in the Moselle department, France
 Coligny, North West, a maize farming town near Lichtenburg, North West Province, South Africa
 Coligny Beach Park, an oceanside park with landscaped walking & biking paths on Hilton Head Island, South Carolina.

Other
 Coligny calendar, a 1st-century lunisolar calendar
 Coligny Commando, a light infantry regiment of the South African Army
 Fort Coligny, a fortress founded by Nicolas Durand de Villegaignon in Rio de Janeiro, Brazil in 1555
 Coligny-Welch signal lamp, as used on Railway semaphore signal

See also
 Cologny
 Cologna (disambiguation)
 Cologne (disambiguation)
 Cologno (disambiguation)